Ian MacNeil (born April 27, 1977) is a Canadian former professional ice hockey centre who played in two National Hockey League (NHL) games with the Philadelphia Flyers during the 2002–03 season.

After many years in the AHL, MacNeil played for a short time in Germany. Following a short stint with the AHL team Toronto Marlies, MacNeil found a new home in Europe again. MacNeil last played for the Heilbronner Falken in the 2nd Bundesliga.

Career statistics

External links
 

1977 births
Living people
Beast of New Haven players
Canadian ice hockey centres
Canadian people of Scottish descent
Cincinnati Cyclones (IHL) players
Hartford Whalers draft picks
Heilbronner Falken players
Sportspeople from Halifax, Nova Scotia
Lausanne HC players
Lørenskog IK players
Lowell Lock Monsters players
Oshawa Generals players
Philadelphia Flyers players
Philadelphia Phantoms players
Schwenninger Wild Wings players
HC Sierre players
Toronto Marlies players
Vaasan Sport players
Vienna Capitals players
Ice hockey people from Nova Scotia
Canadian expatriate ice hockey players in Finland